The TwoByThree EP was the first EP release under the Hideous Records label, and also the first from the label to feature other bands.  The EP is a three-way split between Reuben, The Ghost of a Thousand and Baddies (ex-member of Engerica, Michael Webster's new project).  The EP was limited to 500 in stores and 1000 at Reuben shows.

Track listing

Trivia

 The cover artwork is by Hannah Buck.

2008 EPs
Reuben (band) albums